Salem Port may refer to:

 Port of Salem, New Jersey
 Salem Harbor, Massachusetts